Philips Consumer Communications, L.P. (abbreviated to PCC) was a $2.5 billion joint venture of Lucent Technologies and Royal Philips Electronics formed on October 7, 1997. Philips owned 60% of the joint venture, with Lucent owning the other 40%.
PCC was a global venture, with branches in more than 100 countries, including the US, Latin America, Asia-Pacific and Europe.
Analysts predicted PCC would become one of the major players in the consumer communications business.

The company consisted of the consumer communications equipment businesses of the companies. Both companies made products in the venture, often not sold under their own names. Philips Consumer Communications produced the following equipment:
 digital/analog cellular phones – sold under Philips brand
 corded/cordless phones – sold under AT&T brand
 answering machines – sold under AT&T brand
 screen phones – sold under Philips brand
 pagers/cellular telephones – sold under both Lucent/Philips brands
Eventually, all telecommunications products made in the venture would have been sold under the Philips brand.

In 1998, Lucent and Philips announced it would dissolve its joint venture, after garnering only a 2% market share in mobile phones and losing $500 million on a revenue of $2.5 billion. Both companies initially re-absorbed their respective assets in the joint venture, but Lucent subsequently sold off its parts to VTech and Motorola.

PCC was headquartered in Parsippany, New Jersey.

References

Alcatel-Lucent
Philips